Curimatella is a genus of toothless characins from South America, with five currently described species:
 Curimatella alburna (J. P. Müller & Troschel, 1844)
 Curimatella dorsalis (C. H. Eigenmann & R. S. Eigenmann, 1889)
 Curimatella immaculata (Fernández-Yépez, 1948)
 Curimatella lepidura (C. H. Eigenmann & R. S. Eigenmann, 1889)
 Curimatella meyeri (Steindachner, 1882)

References
 

Curimatidae
Taxa named by Rosa Smith Eigenmann
Taxa named by Carl H. Eigenmann
Ray-finned fish genera